Iain Collings from the Commonwealth Scientific and Industrial Research Organisation (CSIRO), Epping, Australia was named Fellow of the Institute of Electrical and Electronics Engineers (IEEE) in 2015 for contributions to multiple user and multiple antenna wireless communication systems.

Collings was born in Melbourne, Australia. He achieved his Bachelor of Engineering (B.E) degree in 1992 and Doctor of Philosophy degree in 1995 from University of Melbourne and Australian National University respectively.

References 

Fellow Members of the IEEE
Australian electrical engineers
Living people
Year of birth missing (living people)